Horses and High Heels is the 19th solo album release by British singer Marianne Faithfull. The 13-track album was released on 31 January 2011 in continental Europe and on 7 March 2011 in the UK on the Dramatico record label. It was released in the United States on 28 June 2011 via the French Naïve Records label.

"Why Did We Have to Part?" was released as a single from the album.

Background and context 
Recorded in New Orleans at Piety Street Recording in the Bywater in September and October 2010, the album features cover versions of 1960s classics and seven new songs, four of which were co-written by Faithfull herself. One of the new songs, "The Old House", was specially written for her by Irish playwright Frank McGuiness. There are two cameo appearances on guitar from Lou Reed with further cameos from Dr. John and MC5's Wayne Kramer. The album was produced by long-term collaborator Hal Willner.

Critical reception
Rolling Stone gave the album a three-star rating, stating it is "heavy with lost love and Faithfull's honey-over-gravel voice."

Track listing 
 "The Stations" (Greg Dulli, Mark Lanegan) – 4:24
 "Why Did We Have To Part" (Laurent Voulzy, Faithfull) – 3:45
 "That’s How Every Empire Falls" (R.B. Morris) – 5:51
 "No Reason" (Jackie Lomax) – 2:51
 "Prussian Blue" (David Courts, Faithfull) – 5:03
 "Love Song" (Lesley Duncan) – 4:37
 "Gee Baby" (J.J. Johnson, Mary Alma Baker, Sylvia Robinson, Tyler T. Texas) – 2:49
 "Goin' Back" (Carole King, Gerry Goffin) – 3:41
 "Past Present and Future" (Arthur Butler, George "Shadow" Morton, Jerry Leiber) – 2:46
 "Horses and High Heels" (Doug Pettibone, Faithfull) – 3:52
 "Back in Baby’s Arms" (Allen Toussaint) – 4:19
 "Eternity" (Doug Pettibone, Faithfull) – 4:03
 "The Old House" (Frank McGuiness, Leo Abrahams) – 4:04
Bonus tracks on the vinyl edition:
 "Fragile Weapon" (Devon T. Williams)
 "I Don´t Wanna Know" (Rupert Charles Guidy)

Charts

In 2011 it was awarded a double silver certification from the Independent Music Companies Association which indicated sales of at least 40,000 copies throughout Europe.

References

2011 albums
Marianne Faithfull albums
Albums produced by Hal Willner